Zakhar Vladimirovich Dubensky (born 19 October 1978) is a retired Russian football midfielder. He last played for FC Volgar-Gazprom Astrakhan.

Playing career

* – played games and goals

Honours
Champion of Latvia: 2006, 2007, 2008

References

1978 births
Living people
Russian footballers
Russian expatriate footballers
FC Rotor Volgograd players
FC KAMAZ Naberezhnye Chelny players
FC Fakel Voronezh players
FC Olimpia Volgograd players
FK Ventspils players
FC Spartak Vladikavkaz players
Expatriate footballers in Latvia
Sportspeople from Volgograd
Russian Premier League players
FC Luch Vladivostok players
Russian expatriate sportspeople in Latvia
FC Volgar Astrakhan players
Association football midfielders
FC Torpedo NN Nizhny Novgorod players